Radovan Sloboda may refer to:
 Radovan Sloboda (ice hockey) (born 1982), Slovak professional ice hockey player
 Radovan Sloboda (politician) (born 1966), Slovak politician and sport administrator